Ekaterina Gordeeva and Sergei Grinkov refers to a pair skating team. Please see:

 Ekaterina Gordeeva
 Sergei Grinkov

Russian pair skaters